Kyriakos Karataidis (born 4 July 1965) is a former Greek football player. He played for Olympiacos, as well as for the national side.

Career
Born in Oinoi, Kastoria, Karataidis began playing senior club football with Flatsata Oinois in 1981, and joined Kastoria F.C. one year later in 1982.

In 1988, Karataidis would join Olympiacos F.C., the club he would play for until he retired in 2001. He won five consecutive Alpha Ethniki and three Greek Football Cup titles with Olympiacos.

Karataidis made 34 appearances for the Greece national football team from 1990 to 1998. He competed at the 1994 FIFA World Cup finals.

Honours

Club
Olympiacos
Greek Championship: 1997, 1998, 1999, 2000, 2001
Greek Cup: 1990, 1992, 1999
Greek Super Cup: 1992

References

External links

1965 births
Living people
Greek footballers
Greece international footballers
Olympiacos F.C. players
Kastoria F.C. players
Super League Greece players
1994 FIFA World Cup players
Greek beach soccer players
Association football defenders
People from Kastoria (regional unit)
Footballers from Western Macedonia